Ana Maria Portinho Magalhães (born January 21, 1950) is a Brazilian film actress and director.

She is known for protesting against the arrest of Iranian filmmaker Jafar Panahi, detained on 1 March 2010 and held in ward 209 of the Evin prison.

Filmography

As actor
 1965 - Arrastão
 1967 - Todas as Mulheres do Mundo
 1967 - Garota de Ipanema
 1967 - O Diabo Mora no Sangue
 1970 - The Alienist
 1971 - A Guerra dos Pelados
 1971 - Mãos Vazias
 1972 - How Tasty Was My Little Frenchman
 1972 - Minha Namorada
 1972 - O Doce Esporte do Sexo
 1972 - Os Devassos
 1972 - Quando o Carnaval Chegar
 1973 - Joanna Francesa
 1973 - Quem É Beta?
 1973 - Uirá, um Índio em Busca de Deus
 1973 - Sagarana: The Duel
 1975 - As Deliciosas Traições do Amor
 1975 - Amantes, Amanhã Se Houver Sol
 1976 - Paranóia
 1977 - Lucio Flavio
 1977 - Se Segura, Malandro
 1978 - Anchieta, José do Brasil
 1981 - The Age of the Earth
 1980 - Os Sete Gatinhos
 1983 - Os Trapalhões na Serra Pelada
 1984 - Tensão no Rio
 1990 - Real Desejo
 1992 - Oswaldianas

References

External links

 Filmography

Brazilian actresses
1950 births
Living people
Portuguese people of Brazilian descent
Actresses from Rio de Janeiro (city)
Brazilian people of Portuguese descent
Brazilian people of Spanish descent